Olarikkara, usually called Olari, is an important gateway to Thrissur city of Kerala state, South India.  It is a major residential area in the city.  It is 5 km away from Thrissur city. Several Hospitals, Temples and Churches are situated here. One of the E.S.I Hospitals of the city is here. Like all the places in Thrissur, it has very good bus facilities. Olari is Ward 46 of Thrissur Municipal Corporation.

History
The village got its name from a root story about the Temple of Shree Bhagavathy. Hundreds of years ago there was a Sacred Brahmin’s house where the temple is situated now. At the "Nadumuttom" of the house, it is believed that there was the presence of ‘Goddess Vanadurga’ and this Goddess was worshipped by the Brahmin with full faith. At that time the Brahmin was titled with surname "Ola" by the rulers. Hence the location of  the temple was renowned as "Ola Irikkum Kara" which is later renowned as Olarikara.

Important Amenities
 Federal bank
 South Indian Bank
 South Malabar Grammeen bank
 Bank of baroda
 Trichur urban co operative bank
 Govt Ayueveda dispensary
 Navajyothi B ED college
 Ayyanthole telephone exchange
 Ayyanthole K S E B
 Kerala lakshmi mill
 Trichur West A E O office
 Mother Hospital
 C.A.M Hospital
 E.S.I Hospital
 Thattil Supermarket
 Ilajithara charitable trust
 Karthika Super Market
 Margin free market
 Sheeba Theatre
 Bhavi Badhra Kuries
 Niya Regency 4 Star Hotel
 State Bank of India
Dr Jawaharlal's Clinic
Sagar Hotel

Important Places to Worship
Little Flower Church (a Church of Roman Catholic Syro malabar rite community and even has a High School in its name)
Shree Bhagavathy Temple (also called 'Durga' Temple. The main deity here is Durga)
Sri Parthasarathy Temple (main deity worshipped here is Lord Krishna)
Sree Chathan Temple
Mosque

See also
 Thrissur
 Thrissur District

References

Suburbs of Thrissur city